Julieta Solange Díaz Núñez (born September 9, 1977) is an Argentine model and actress.

Biography
Julieta Díaz was born on September 9, 1977 in Buenos Aires, Argentina. She began studying theater at age 12. Her father, Ricardo Díaz Mourelle, an actor over 35 years ago, was one of her great teachers. Her mother, María Núñez, is an astrologer.

Career
At age 17 she studied theater with Rubens Correa, when, through Fernando Spiner, she appeared at the casting and was chosen for the miniseries Bajamar, la costa del silencio. She participated in Verdad consecuencia, Nueve lunas, Carola Casini, Como pan caliente, De poeta y de loco, Gasoleros and La condena de Gabriel Doyle among other television programs. Meanwhile, she continued taking classes with Cristina Moreira, Rubens Correa and Javier Margulis. The recognition came with Campeones de la vida and from there he jumped to a co-star, along with Oscar Martínez and Catherine Fulop, in Ilusiones. In little more than three years she went from becoming a popular actress to becoming a better actress, receiving the Clarín Shows Award for her role in 099 Central. She was also convened by the Mexican group Maná for the realization of their video clip treacherous Butterfly, by Gustavo Cerati for Crime, Diego Torres for Dreams, among other video clips. In 2003 she starred with Osvaldo Laport and Juan Darthés the soap opera Soy gitano. The following year she was the protagonist of the unit Locas de amor. For the soap opera Soy gitano she took flamenco classes with Claudia Bauthian, Laura Manzella, Marcela Suez and the great teacher La China. In 2005 she acted in the work Emma Bovary. That same year she was seen on TV starring in a chapter of Botines and two of Mujeres asesinas. Meanwhile, she continued taking classes with Ana María Bovo, Gabriel Chamé Buen Día and Cristina Moreira. 
In 2006 she participated in two other chapters of Mujeres asesinas and two chapters of Al límite. During 2009 she starred in the hit soap opera Valientes, at the same time that she performed the theatrical season in Buenos Aires and during the summer in Mar del Plata with the play El año que viene a la misma hora with Adrián Suar, directed by Marcos Carnevale. In 2010, and until today, she began taking singing lessons with teacher and vocal coach Katie Viqueria. In 2011 she starred alongside Facundo Arana, Benjamin Rojas and Lali Espósito the soap opera Cuando me sonreís. In 2012 she had a special participation in Graduados, fiction of Underground which was issued by Telefe and was starring Nancy Dupláa and Daniel Hendler. In addition, she was called to make a special participation in Condicionados unit starring Soledad Silveyra and Oscar Martínez which was issued by Canal 13. In cinema she starred in 2006 Maradona, the Hand of God; in 2007  La señal; in 2008 Norma Arrostito and Gaby, la montonera. In cinema she starred in 2011 Juan y Eva with the direction of Paula De Luque. She also participated in Derecho de familia, Herencia, Déjala correr and Ruptura. In 2012 the film Dos más dos, was released starring alongside Adrián Suar and with the direction of Diego Kaplan. In 2013 she starred alongside Guillermo Francella the film Corazón de León with the direction of Marcos Carnevale. In 2013 she also starred, together with Gabriel Goity and  Laura Esquivel, Los Locos Addams, the Argentine version of the Broadway musical, in the role of Morticia Addams. In 2014 she participated in the successful En terapia alongside Diego Peretti. For this performance she received the Martín Fierro Award for Best Supporting Actress. She also made a special participation in Sres. Papis alongside Joaquín Furriel. During the same year she starred in the film  Refugiado. In 2015 she participated in the unit La casa. In 2016, she star in the unitary of Pol-ka Silencios de familia with Adrián Suar and Florencia Bertotti. For several years now she has been one of the actresses representing Head & Shoulders in Argentina.

Television

Movies

Theater

Videoclips

Awards and nominations

References

External links

 

1977 births
People from Buenos Aires
Argentine film actresses
Living people
Place of birth missing (living people)